A three-point field goal (also 3-pointer, three, or trey) is a field goal in a basketball game made from beyond the three-point line, a designated arc surrounding the basket. A successful attempt is worth three points, in contrast to the two points awarded for field goals made within the three-point line and the one point for each made free throw.

Every three-point line becomes parallel to each sideline at the points where each arc is a specified distance from the sideline.
In 3x3, a FIBA-sanctioned variant of the half-court 3-on-3 game, the same line exists, but shots from behind it are only worth 2 points with all other shots worth 1 point.

History
The three-point line was first tested at the collegiate level in 1945, with a 21-foot line, in a game between Columbia and Fordham, but it was not kept as a rule. There was another one-game experiment in 1958, this time with a 23-foot line, in a game between St. Francis (NY) and Siena. In 1961, Boston University and Dartmouth played one game with an experimental rule that counted all field goals as three points. In 1962, the St. Francis (NY) head coach, Daniel Lynch, once again made the suggestion of a 3pt line to the New York Basketball Writers Association.

At the direction of Abe Saperstein, the American Basketball League (ABL) became the first basketball league to institute the rule in 1961. As commissioner of the new league, Saperstein wanted to add excitement to the game and distinguish the league from the bigger NBA. He hoped the three-pointer would become basketball's equivalent of the home run. “We must have a weapon,” Saperstein said, “and this is ours.”

To determine the distance the new shot line should be from the basket, Saperstein and longtime DePaul University coach Ray Meyer went onto a court one day with tape and selected 25 feet as the right length. “They just arbitrarily drew lines,” his son Jerry Saperstein said. “There’s really no scientific basis. Just two Hall of Fame coaches getting together and saying: ‘Where would we like to see the line?’” Not long after, in June 1961, Saperstein was traveling when the other seven ABL owners voted 4-3 to officially shorten the line, to 22 feet. Saperstein, who had significant power in the league as owner of the popular Globetrotters, disagreed with this and simply ignored the ruling. Games continued with the  shot. Saperstein eventually acknowledged there was one problem with the 25-foot arc and solved it by adding a 22-foot line in the corners. “It made for interesting possibilities,” he wrote.

After the ABL shut down in 1963, the three-point shot was adopted by the Eastern Professional Basketball League in its 1963–64 season. It was also popularized by the American Basketball Association (ABA), which introduced it in its inaugural 1967–68  ABA commissioner George Mikan stated that the three-pointer "would give the smaller player a chance to score and open up the defense to make the game more enjoyable for the fans". During the 1970s, the ABA used the three-point shot, along with the slam dunk, as a marketing tool to compete with the NBA. Its ninth and final season concluded in the spring 

Three years later in June 1979, the NBA adopted the three-point line (initially on a one-year trial) for the   despite the view of many that it was a gimmick. Chris Ford of the Boston Celtics is credited with making the first three-point shot in NBA history on October 12, 1979. The season opener at Boston Garden was more remarkable for the debut of Larry Bird (and two new  Rick Barry of the Houston Rockets, in his final season, also made one in the same game, and Kevin Grevey of the Washington Bullets made one that Friday night 

The sport's international governing body, FIBA, introduced the three-point line in 1984,  and it made its Olympic debut in 1988 in Seoul, South Korea.

The NCAA's Southern Conference became the first collegiate conference to use the three-point rule, adopting a  line for the 1980–81 season. Ronnie Carr of Western Carolina was the first to score a three-point field goal in college basketball history on November 29, 1980. Over the following five years, NCAA conferences differed in their use of the rule and distance required for a three-pointer.

The NFHS, along with elementary and middle schools, adopted a  line nationally in 1987, a year after the NCAA. The NCAA experimented with the  FIBA three-point line distance in the National Invitation Tournament (NIT)  then adopted that distance for all men's play with a phased conversion that began with Division I in the 2019–20 season. The NAIA and other American associations also adopted the new NCAA distance for their respective men's play. In that same 2019–20 season, the NCAA planned to experiment with the FIBA arc in women's postseason events other than the NCAA championships in each division, most notably the Women's National Invitation Tournament and Women's Basketball Invitational; these events were ultimately scrapped due to the COVID-19 pandemic. The NCAA announced on June 3, 2021 that the FIBA three-point distance would be extended to the women's game starting in 2021–22.

In December 2012, the WNBA announced that it would use the FIBA distance, starting in 2013; by 2017, the distance at the corners was lengthened to match the NBA. The NBA has discussed adding a four-point line, according to president Rod Thorn.

In the NBA, three-point field goals became increasingly more frequent along the years, especially by mid-2015 onward. The increase in latter years has been attributed to NBA player Stephen Curry, who is credited with revolutionizing the game by inspiring teams to regularly employ the three-point shot as part of their winning strategy. Curry is ranked highest in "Off Ball" average attention drawn. Calculated by the average attention each player receives as the total amount of time guarded by each defensive player divided by the total time playing, Curry's was ranked at 1.064, with Kevin Durant coming in second at 1.063.

Rule specifications

A three-point line consists of an arc at a set radius measured from the point on the floor directly below the center of the basket, and two parallel lines equidistant from each sideline extending from the nearest end line to the point at which they intersect the arc. In the NBA, WNBA, NCAA or NAIA, and FIBA standards, the arc spans the width of the court until it is a specified minimum distance from each sideline. The three-point line then becomes parallel to the sidelines from those points to the baseline. In American high school standards, the arc spans 180° around the basket, then becomes parallel to the sidelines from the plane of the basket center to the baseline.
The distance of the three-point line to the center of the hoop varies by level:

The high school corner minimum is taken as a requirement for newer high school gymnasiums and fieldhouses built in the three-point era. Courts built in older eras before state high school sanctioning bodies issued rules regarding court sizes have narrower markings, requiring home court ground rules where there is less space behind the three-point arc, the space on the sides of the arc can barely accommodate the shooter's feet due to lack of room, or it may be marked closer than the suggested minimum.

A player's feet must be completely behind the three-point line at the time of the shot or jump in order to make a three-point attempt; if the player's feet are on or in front of the line, it is a two-point attempt. A player is allowed to jump from outside the line and land inside the line to make a three-point attempt, as long as the ball is released in mid-air.

An official raises his/her arm with three fingers extended to signal the shot attempt. If the attempt is successful, he/she raises his/her other arm with all fingers fully extended in manner similar to a football official signifying successful field goal to indicate the three-point goal. The official must recognize it for it to count as three points. Instant replay has sometimes been used, depending on league rules. The NBA, WNBA FIBA and the NCAA specifically allow replay for this purpose. In NBA, WNBA & FIBA games, video replay does not have to occur immediately following a shot; play can continue and the officials can adjust the scoring later in the game, after reviewing the video. However, in late game situations, play may be paused pending a review.

If a shooter is fouled while attempting a three-pointer and subsequently misses the shot, the shooter is awarded three free-throw attempts. If a player completes a three-pointer while being fouled, the player is awarded one free-throw for a possible 4-point play. Conceivably, if a player completed a three-pointer while being fouled, and that foul was ruled as either a Flagrant 1 or a Flagrant 2 foul, the player would be awarded two free throws for a possible 5-point play.

Related concepts
Major League Lacrosse (MLL) featured a two-point line which forms a  arc around the front of the goal. Shots taken from behind this line count for two points, as opposed to the standard one point. The Premier Lacrosse League, which absorbed MLL in a December 2020 merger, plays under MLL rules, including the two-point arc.

In gridiron football, a standard field goal is worth three points; various professional and semi-pro leagues have experimented with four-point field goals. The Arena Football League awarded four points for any successful drop kicked field goal (like the three-point shot, the drop kick is more challenging than a standard place kick, as the bounce of the ball makes a kick less predictable, and arena football also uses narrower goal posts for all kicks than the outdoor game does).

During the existence of the World Hockey Association (WHA) in the 1970s, there were proposals for two-point hockey goals for shots taken beyond an established distance (one proposal was a 44-foot (13.4m) arc, which would have intersected the faceoff circles), but this proposal gained little support and faded after the WHA merged with the National Hockey League. It was widely believed that long-distance shots in hockey had little direct relation to skill (usually resulting more from goalies' vision being screened or obscured), plus with the lower scoring intrinsic to the sport a two-point goal was seen as disruptive of the structure of the game.

The super goal is a similar concept in Australian rules football, in which a  arc determines the value of a goal; within the arc, it is the usual 6 points, but 9 points are scored for a "super goal" scored from outside the arc. To date the super goal is only used in pre-season games and not in the season proper.

The National Professional Soccer League II, which awarded two points for all goals except those on the power play, also used a three-point line, drawn  from the goal. It has since been adopted by some other indoor soccer leagues.

The 2020 Suncorp Super Netball league season saw the addition of the two-goal Super Shot. The Super Shot provides goal attacks and goal shooters the opportunity to score two goals by shooting from a 1.9m designated zone within the goal circle and will be active in the final five minutes of each quarter.

See also
 50–40–90 club, exclusive group of players who have made at least 50% of field goals (counting both two-pointers and three-pointers), 40% of three-pointers, and 90% of free throws in a season.
 List of National Basketball Association career 3-point scoring leaders
 List of NCAA Division I men's basketball career 3-point scoring leaders
 List of NCAA Division I women's basketball career 3-point scoring leaders

Footnotes

References

External links
NBA.com's Top 10 three-pointers from past 25 years
Article on Columbia's experimentation with the three-point field goal decades before its official introduction
"Long Live the Three" by Steve Shutt, Basketball Hall of Fame

Scoring (basketball)
Basketball terminology
American Basketball Association
American Basketball League (1961–62)
1961 introductions